Pilsdon Pen is a 277-metre (909 ft) hill in Dorset in South West England, situated at the north end of the Marshwood Vale, approximately  west of Beaminster. It is Dorset's second highest point and has panoramic views extending for many miles. It was bequeathed to the National Trust by the Pinney family in 1982. For many years it was thought to be Dorset's highest hill, until modern survey revealed that nearby Lewesdon Hill was 2 metres higher.

Geology
The hill is a lower greensand Cretaceous outcrop situated amongst Jurassic strata of marl and clay, at the border between the chalk of South-East England and the granite of Devon and Cornwall.

Archaeology
The hill is topped by an Iron Age multivallate Durotrigian hill fort which was excavated in the 1960s by Peter Gelling of the University of Birmingham with his wife Margaret Gelling at the request of Michael Pinney. The remains of 14 roundhouses were uncovered near the centre of the hill fort. Surveys were also carried out by the National Trust in 1982, the Royal Commission on the Historical Monuments of England in 1995, and the University of Bournemouth in 2016.

There are differing views as to the age of the rectilinear (square) structures in the centre of the fort: they may be medieval "pillow mounds" (man-made mounds for breeding rabbits), or could be earlier in origin. There is no clear evidence to distinguish the other mounds between pillow mounds and burial mounds, and the acid soil causes almost all bone and pottery to be in very poor condition. The National Trust in the 1982 excavations (which restored the mounds to their original profile prior to Gelling's excavation) viewed them as medieval; Gelling thought there was a case they were earlier. Additional rectilinear structures are noted in the 1999 National Trust Resistivity survey.. The 2016 survey shows over 60 roundhouses, some with overlapping locations, indicating a long period of occupation.

The hillfort and associated remains are a scheduled monument and it was on the Heritage at Risk Register but was removed in 2022 as a result of the Hillforts and Habitats Project.

Landscape
Other notable high points in the vicinity are Lewesdon Hill (279 m), Dorset's highest point some 4 kilometres to the east, and Blackdown Hill (215 m), about 2 kilometres northwest. Though using the spelling Pillesdon, it was the central triangulation point for the area between 12 April and 1 June 1845 for the Principal Triangulation of Great Britain.

Dorothy and William Wordsworth
In 1795–7 Dorothy and William Wordsworth lived at Racedown House—a property of the Pinney family—to the west of Pilsdon Pen. They walked in the area for about two hours every day, and the nearby hills—including Pilsdon Pen—consoled Dorothy as she pined for the fells of her native Lakeland. She wrote,
"We have hills which, seen from a distance almost take the character of mountains, some cultivated nearly to their summits, others in their wild state covered with furze and broom. These delight me the most as they remind me of our native wilds."

See also
 Lewesdon Hill

Notes

Bibliography
 Gelling, P. S. 1977: Excavations on Pilsdon Pen, Dorset, 1964-71. Proceedings of the Prehistoric Society 43, 263-286.
 Publications of the Dorset Natural History and Archaeological Society - Excavations at Pilsdon Pen, P.S.Gelling, 86 102; 87 90; 88 106-107; 89 123-125; 90 166-167; 91 177-178; 92 126-127; 93 133-134
 Publications of the Dorset Natural History and Archaeological Society - Excavations at Pilsdon Pen Hillfort, 1982, D.W.R.Thackray, 104 178-179

External links
 The Dorset Page
 The modern antiquarian
 National Trust Annual Archaeological Review 1999-2000
 Photos from Geograph 
 The NT sign at the start of the path (Feb 2008)
 Stile inscribed with Wordsworth quote 
 The history of the Screaming Skull and Pinney Family 

Hill forts in Dorset
Hills of Dorset
National Trust properties in Dorset